The National Museum of Taiwan Literature (NMTL) is a museum located in Tainan, Republic of China (Taiwan). The museum researches, catalogs, preserves, and exhibits literary artifacts. As part of its multilingual, multi-ethnic focus, it holds a large collection of local works in Taiwanese, Japanese, Mandarin and Classical Chinese.

It was planned as a national-level organization to fill in a long-perceived gap in how the Republic of China's institutions had handled Taiwanese literature as a field of academic inquiry and popular discourse. Tainan was chosen for its historical significance as a cultural center.

History
The building was constructed in 1916 during the Japanese rule of Taiwan. The Council for Cultural Affairs under the Executive Yuan set up the initial planning office. The museum was opened in 2003.

Activities
The museum houses the cultural heritage research center of Bureau of Cultural Heritage.

Transportation
The museum is accessible within walking distance South West from Tainan Station of the Taiwan Railways.

See also
 Ministry of Culture (Taiwan)
 List of museums in Taiwan
 Taiwanese literature

References

External links 

 National Museum of Taiwan Literature website
 Digital archive of the National Museum of Taiwan Literature

2003 establishments in Taiwan
Museums established in 2003
Literature
Literary museums in Taiwan
Museums in Tainan
Japanese literature
Chinese literature